Sarangani, officially the Municipality of Sarangani, is a 4th class municipality in the province of Davao Occidental, Philippines. According to the 2020 census, it has a population of 22,515 people.

Geography

The municipality consists of 2 major islands (the eponymous Sarangani Island and Balut Island) and 1 minor islet (Olanivan Island), collectively called as the Sarangani Islands, located just south of Mindanao island in the Celebes Sea. It is the municipality of the Philippines bordering Indonesia.

Climate
Sarangani has a tropical rainforest climate (Af) with moderate to heavy rainfall year-round.

Barangays

Sarangani is politically subdivided into 12 barangays.

Balut Island
 Batuganding
 Konel
 Lipol
 Mabila (Poblacion)
 Tinina
 Gomtago
 Tagen
 Tucal

Sarangani Island
 Patuco (Sarangani Norte) 
 Laker (Sarangani Sur)
 Camahual
 Camalig

Demographics

Economy

Government
Municipal officials 2013-2016:
 Mayor: Virginia Cawa
 Vice Mayor: Jerry Cawa
 Councilors:
 Alfredo Lora
 Sergio Tablingon
 Adelan de Arce
 Jamere Ismael
 Lorencio Angin
 Windy Grace Gomez
 Jovanie Amierol
 Arturo Olarte, Jr.

References

External links
 Sarangani Profile at the DTI Cities and Municipalities Competitive Index
 [ Philippine Standard Geographic Code]
 Philippine Census Information
 Local Governance Performance Management System

Municipalities of Davao Occidental
Island municipalities in the Philippines